The following Union Army units and commanders fought in the Battle of Fort Stedman (March 25, 1865) during the Petersburg Campaign of the American Civil War. Even though the IX Corps was the principal Union participant between 4:30 and 8:00 a.m., the time period which centrally defines this Battle, desultory skirmishing was officially reported by elements of the II, V and VI Corps and produced casualties in these Corps on the day of battle. Order of battle is compiled from the official reports which observed casualties.  The Confederate order of battle is listed separately.

Military Rank Abbreviations Used
 MG = Major General
 BG = Brigadier General
 Col = Colonel
 Ltc = Lieutenant Colonel
 Maj = Major
 Cpt = Captain
 Lt = Lieutenant

Other
 w = wounded
 mw = mortally wounded
 k = killed
 c = captured

Army of the Potomac

II Corps

MG Andrew A. Humphreys

V Corps

MG Gouverneur K. Warren

VI Corps

MG Horatio G. Wright

IX Corps

MG John G. Parke

Notes

References
U.S. War Department, The War of the Rebellion: a Compilation of the Official Records of the Union and Confederate Armies, U.S. Government Printing Office, 1880–1901.

American Civil War orders of battle